Cherokee Township is a township in Cherokee County, Kansas, USA.  As of the 2000 census, its population was 336.

Geography
Cherokee Township covers an area of  surrounding the incorporated settlement of Weir.  According to the USGS, it contains three cemeteries: Council Corners, New Pleasant View and Saint Anthony.

References
 USGS Geographic Names Information System (GNIS)

External links
 City-Data.com

Townships in Cherokee County, Kansas
Townships in Kansas